Vicente Fernández (born 5 April 1946) is an Argentine golfer who has won more than 60 professional tournaments around the world.

Fernández was born in Corrientes, Argentina. He turned professional in 1964 and was a regular competitor on the European Tour from the mid-1970s to the mid-1990s. He won four titles on the tour and had two top ten Order of Merit finishes, placing 6th in 1974 and 9th in 1975. He was sixteenth on the Order of Merit in 1992 at the age of 46.

As a senior Fernández moved to the United States to play on the Senior PGA Tour (now the Champions Tour), where he has won four tournaments. His other wins include eight victories in his national open championship, the Argentine Open.

Professional wins (72)

European Tour wins (4)

European Tour playoff record (1–0)

Argentine wins (51)
1967 Argentine Masters, North Open
1968 Argentine Open
1969 Argentine Open
1970 Center Open, Abierto del Litoral, Norpatagonico Open, Acantilados Grand Prix
1971 Argentine Masters
1972 Abierto del Litoral
1973 Acantilados Grand Prix, Norpatagonico Open, Chaco Open
1974 Acantilados Grand Prix, Metropolitano Open, Chaco Open, Fultom Grand Prix, Hindu Club Grand Prix
1975 South Open, Rio Cuarto Open
1976 Argentine PGA Championship
1977 Acantilados Grand Prix
1978 Argentine PGA Championship, Abierto del Litoral, Argentino Golf Club Grand Prix, Ford Taunnus Grand Prix, Swift Grand Prix
1979 Pinamar Open
1980 Argentine PGA Championship, Abierto del Litoral, Hindu Club Match Play
1981 Argentine Open, Argentine PGA Championship, South Open, Acantilados Grand Prix
1982 Pinamar Open, Praderas Grand Prix (tie with Armando Saavedra)
1983 Ford Taunnus Grand Prix, Praderas Grand Prix
1984 Argentine Open, Acantilados Grand Prix, Praderas Grand Prix
1985 Argentine Open
1986 Argentine Open, South Open, Parana Open, Hindu Club Grand Prix
1987 Argentine PGA Championship
1990 Argentine Open
1999 Bariloche Match Play
2000 Argentine Open

Other wins (10)
1962 Argentine National Caddy's Tournament
1970 Dutch Open
1971 Santiago Open (Chile)
1972 Ford Maracaibo Open
1975 Uruguay Open
1977 Brazil Open
1982 El Rodeo Open (Colombia)
1983 Brazil Open
1984 Brazil Open
1994 Punta del Este Open (Uruguay)

Champions Tour wins (4)

Other senior wins (3)
1996 Argentine Senior PGA Championship
1999 Argentine Senior PGA Championship
2000 Chrysler Senior Match Play Challenge

Results in major championships

Note: Fernández only played in The Open Championship.

CUT = missed the half-way cut (3rd round cut in 1981 Open Championship)
"T" indicates a tie for a place

Team appearances
World Cup (representing Argentina): 1970, 1972, 1978, 1984, 1985
Hennessy Cognac Cup (representing the Rest of the World): 1982
Dunhill Cup (representing Argentina): 1986, 1989, 1990, 1993, 1995
UBS Cup (representing the Rest of the World): 2003 (tie)

See also 

 Fall 1976 PGA Tour Qualifying School graduates

References

External links

Argentine male golfers
European Tour golfers
PGA Tour Champions golfers
Sportspeople from Corrientes Province
Sportspeople from Buenos Aires
1946 births
Living people